The Vietnamese Wikipedia is the Vietnamese-language edition of Wikipedia, a free, publicly editable, online encyclopedia supported by the Wikimedia Foundation. As with other language editions of Wikipedia, the project's content is both created and accessed using the MediaWiki wiki software. The Vietnamese Wikipedia's primary competitor is the Encyclopedic Dictionary of Vietnam (Từ điển Bách khoa toàn thư Việt Nam), a state-funded encyclopedic dictionary also available online.

Content
It is the fifth largest Wikipedia in a non-European language, as well as the third largest for a language which is official in only one country. As of 2019, it had only 449,000 articles manually created, with 63% of its articles having been made by bots, thus ranking 3rd among non-European language Wikipedias after the Japanese and Chinese ones at the time.

History
The Vietnamese Wikipedia initially went online in November 2002, with a front page and an article about the Internet Society. The project received little attention and did not begin to receive significant contributions until it was "restarted" in October 2003 and the newer, Unicode-capable MediaWiki software was installed soon after.

By August 2008, the Vietnamese Wikipedia had grown to more than 50,000 articles – a milestone it achieved on August 26 – approximately 432 of which were created by bots. By the time the project reached the 100,000-article milestone on September 12, 2009, bot-generated articles made up around 5% of its corpus. Short articles are designated "stubs"; such articles number in the tens of thousands and include most of the bot-generated articles.

An experimental Wikipedia edition in the obsolete chữ Nôm script began in October 2006 at the Wikimedia Incubator. It was deleted in April 2010. An unrelated wiki encyclopedia project, VinaWiki, transliterates Vietnamese Wikipedia articles into chữ Nôm as part of a project to revive the script.

On June 23, 2014, Vietnam Wikipedians Community has agree to accept using bots to generate articles.

The volunteer-led Vietnam Wikimedians User Group supports the development of the Vietnamese Wikipedia and other Vietnamese-language Wikimedia projects. It gained formal recognition as a Wikimedia user group on 28 August 2018.

The Vietnamese Wikipedia's article count reached 500,000 on 28 September 2012 and 1,000,000 on 15 June 2014.

Software
The Vietnamese Wikipedia uses AVIM, a JavaScript-based input method that allows the user to type accented Vietnamese text in popular input methods, such as Telex, VNI and VIQR. (See Vietnamese language and computers.) The preferred input system can be selected using a box under the sidebar.

Characteristics

The Vietnamese edition of the failed English Wikipedia proposal on importance is a formal guideline.

Vandalism 
Vandalism on the Vietnamese Wikipedia has been covered by the media in Vietnam. Several newspapers have reported about Vietnamese Wikipedia users vandalizing content, mainly articles about singers, actors or characters. These newspapers can cover the news as soon as a program occurs.

Some people are victims of content vandalism such as: Hồ Ngọc Hà, Bảo Thy, Nguyễn Cao Kỳ Duyên (MC) and Kỳ Duyên (beauty pageant) or Isaac Newton and other topics. Miss Đỗ Mỹ Linh was also in a spiral of the same name, similar to the case between anchor and Miss Kỳ Duyên in 2014.

See also
 Vietnamese encyclopedias

References

External links

  Vietnamese Wikipedia
  Vietnamese Wikipedia mobile version
 Vietnam Wikimedians User Group

Wikipedias by language
Vietnamese-language encyclopedias
Internet properties established in 2002
2002 establishments in Vietnam
Vietnamese-language websites